Hondryches avakubi is a moth of the family Noctuidae first described by William Jacob Holland in 1920. It is found in Cameroon and the Democratic Republic of the Congo.

References

Moths described in 1920
Calpinae